Michel Audet (born November 12, 1940) is an economist and a politician in Quebec, Canada. He was the Finance Minister of Quebec in the first Charest government.

Audet was first elected to the National Assembly of Quebec in the 2003 Quebec general election. A member of the Quebec Liberal Party, he was elected in the riding of Laporte. He has a master's degree of Economics from Université Laval and is also a graduate of the École nationale d'administration in Paris. An economist, Audet was Minister of Economic and Regional Development from 2003 to 2004. He was made Finance Minister in 2005.

On February 13, 2007 he announced that he would be leaving politics at the end of his current term. He is not to be confused with Michel Audet, a professor in industrial relations at Université Laval, who currently serves as the representative of the Government of Quebec in Canada's delegation to UNESCO.

External links 
 
 Parti libéral du Québec, press release, February 13, 2007 - Le député libéral de Laporte, Michel Audet, quittera la vie politique 

1940 births
École nationale d'administration alumni
Finance ministers of Quebec
French Quebecers
Living people
Members of the Executive Council of Quebec
Politicians from Saguenay, Quebec
Quebec Liberal Party MNAs
Université Laval alumni
21st-century Canadian politicians